The term halothermal circulation refers to the part of the large-scale ocean circulation that is driven by global density gradients created by surface heat and evaporation.The adjective halothermal derives from halo- referring to salt content and -thermal referring to temperature, factors which together determine the density of sea water. Halothermal circulation is driven primarily by salinity changes and secondarily by temperature changes (as opposed to the thermohaline mode in modern oceans). The generation of high salinity surface waters at low latitudes, which were therefore of higher density and thus sank, is thought to have been the dominant ocean circulation driver during greenhouse climates such as the Cretaceous. Similar dynamics operate today in the Mediterranean.

The formation of bottom waters by halothermal dynamics is considered to be one to two orders of magnitude weaker than in thermohaline systems.

References
 Kennett, J.P. & Stott, L.D., 1990, Proteus and Proto-Oceanus, Paleogene oceans as revealed from Antarctic stable isotope results, ODP Leg 113. Proceedings Ocean Drilling Program, Science Results'' 113, 865–880.

Physical oceanography
Geological processes